Leyendas de México, is a Mexican telenovela produced by Televisa and originally transmitted by Telesistema Mexicano.

Cast 
Jacqueline Andere
Guillermo Aguilar
Carlos Bracho
Pilar Sen
Malena Doria
Angélica María
Enrique Lizalde
Augusto Benedico
Miguel Manzano
Luis Gimeno
Alicia Montoya
Elsa Aguirre
Hortensia Santoveña
Ricardo Mondragón
Socorro Avelar
Daniel Villagrán
Armando Acosta
Blanca de Lyz
Héctor Carlos Flores
Ernesto Alonso
Blanca Sánchez
Fernando Mendoza
Celia Manzano
José Alonso
José Baviera
Miguel Macía
Miguel Suárez
Emily Cranz
Lorenzo de Rodas
Carlos Ancira
Emma Roldán
Raúl Dantes
Felipe Gil
Ada Carrasco
Eduardo Alcaraz
René Molina
Julia Marichal

References

External links 

Mexican telenovelas
Televisa telenovelas
Spanish-language telenovelas
1968 telenovelas
1968 Mexican television series debuts
1968 Mexican television series endings